Zarrin Kola (also Romanized as Zarrīn Kolā; also known as Zarrīn Kolā-ye Pā’īn) is a village in Mian Band Rural District, in the Central District of Nur County, Mazandaran Province, Iran. At the 2006 census, its population was 513, in 133 families.

References 

Populated places in Nur County